Discovery River Boats was an attraction at Walt Disney World's Disney's Animal Kingdom in Lake Buena Vista, Florida, near Orlando.

History
The boats docked at the Safari Village and in Asia.  The ride was a non-stop trip that brought the passengers near to the Tree of Life and past all the lands of the theme park. During the journey, the guests would be shown small animals that had been brought on board. The captain would walk the aisles and point out other items on the trek.  The ride was similar to the Jungle Cruise at the Magic Kingdom, however there was little to see exclusive to the ride. These handful of scenes included a fire-breathing dragon's cave outside Camp Minnie Mickey (intended as a preview for the unbuilt Beastly Kingdom), geysers in Africa, and a bathing Iguanodon outside of Dinoland USA.

The attraction was renamed to "Discovery River Taxi" in November of 1998. The ride was then renamed to "Radio Disney River Cruise" in March of 1999, and played commentary from Radio Disney DJs Just Plain Mark and Zippy. The guests were told that the songs were being broadcast from the top of the Tree of Life. The boats were all re-painted in new colors, and animals were no longer brought on board. The routes were also modified, with boats returning to the departing dock instead of stopping at the other dock for guests to disembark.

The ride closed in late summer 1999 due to large numbers of disappointed guests who had not realized that the ride's original purpose was transportation and showed a minimal number of animals that, with the exception of the Banteng, could all be seen from the paths surrounding the Tree of Life. The docks, however, can still be seen in the park. The Asia dock is now a Baloo and King Louie meet and greet  with the other dock now used as a prop.

The boats are still on Disney property sitting in their maintenance dock in a cast-only area on Marina Alley behind Finding Nemo – The Musical. Two of the boats were later moved to the Magic Kingdom resort area on Bay Lake and the Seven Seas Lagoon, where they were repurposed for a pirate-themed fireworks cruise. The names of these two boats have been changed to “Calm Seas” and “Fair Winds.” They were also repainted to better suit their new role.

See also
List of Disney's Animal Kingdom attractions
River cruise

References

4. “Pirates & Pals Fireworks Voyage” https://wdwnt.com/2018/07/beyond-the-rides-pirates-pals-fireworks-dessert-voyage-at-walt-disney-world/

External links
All Ears - Discovery River Boats
Walt Dated World - Discovery River Boats
Discovery River Boats

Former Walt Disney Parks and Resorts attractions
Walt Disney Parks and Resorts gentle boat rides
Disney's Animal Kingdom
Discovery Island (Disney's Animal Kingdom)
Amusement rides introduced in 1998
Amusement rides that closed in 1999
Asia (Disney's Animal Kingdom)
1998 establishments in Florida
1999 disestablishments in Florida